Faridkot district is a district lying in the South-Western part of Punjab, India with Faridkot city as the district headquarters.

Etymology 
The district is named after its headquarters, Faridkot city, which in turn is named in the honor of Baba Farid, who was a Sufi saint and a Muslim missionary. The town of Faridkot was founded during the 13th century as Mokalhar by Raja Mokalsi, the grandson of Rai Munj, a Bhatti Chief of Bhatnair, Rajasthan. According to popular folklore, the Raja renamed Mokalhar to Faridkot after Baba Farid paid a visit to the town. It remained the capital during the reign of Mokalsi's son Jairsi and Wairsi.

History 

The region was a self-governing princely state during the British Raj period. Prior to independence, a large part of the district was under the rule of the Maharaja of Faridkot and later it became a part of the Patiala & East Punjab States Union (PEPSU ) in 1948. Before independence the Muslim population was 35% mainly from Jat, Mochi, Arain and Tarkhan castes who migrated to Pakistan and settled mainly in Okara, Kasur, Pakpattan and Bahawalnagar Districts. Faridkot was carved out as a separate district on 7 August 1972 out of the areas of erstwhile Bathinda District(Faridkot Tehsil) and Ferozepur District(Moga and Muktsar Tehsils). Further, in November 1995 the Faridkot District was trifurcated when two of its subdivisions viz. Muktsar and Moga were given the status of independent districts.

Government body
Prior to independence large part of the district was under the princely rule of Sikh Maharaja of Faridkot and later it became part of the Patiala & East Punjab States Union (PEPSU )  in 1948. Faridkot was carved out as a separate district on 7 August 1972 out of the areas of Bathinda District (Faridkot Tehsil) and Ferozepur District (Moga and Muktsar Tehsils).  However, in November 1995, the Faridkot District was trifurcated when two of its subdivisions viz Muktsar and Moga were given the status of independent districts.

Faridkot district is surrounded by district Ferozepur in the North-West, Muktsar in the South-West, Bathinda in the South, and Moga in the West.  The District covers an area of 1469 km2. which is 2.92% of the total area of the State and accommodates a population of 552,466, which is 2.27% of the total population of the State. It has three Subdivisions/ Tehsils namely Faridkot, Kotkapura and Jaito and a Sub Tehsil namely Sadiq comprising a total of 171 villages.  Faridkot District has two development blocks namely Faridkot and Kotkapura.

In 2020, Faridkot has been made new police division. Earlier, Faridkot was part of Ferozepur police division. Moga and Mukatsar districts were also attached with Faridkot police division.

Politics

Overview
The Faridkot district contains 2 Cities Faridkot, Kotkapura. More than 7 towns/villages are quite notable in the Faridkot area such as Jaitu, Bajakhana, Panjgarain Kalan, Deep Singh Wala, Golewala, Jhok Sarkari, Doad, Ghugiana, Sadiq, Chand Bhan, etc. Faridkot is a hub for premier educational institutions. North India's only Medical University, also named after Baba Farid is in Faridkot besides Medical

- Guru Gobind Singh Medical College, Engineering and Dental Colleges.

List of villages

 Ahal
 Arayanwala Kalan
 Arayanwala Khurd
 Aulakh
 Bagiana
 Bajakhana
 Bargari
 Beguwala
 Behbal kalan
 Behbal khurd 
 Bhag Singhwala
 Bhagta Bhai Ka
 Bhagthala Kalan
 Bhagthala Khurd
 Bhairon-Ki-Bhatti
 Bhana
 Bhilewala
 Bholuwala
 Bir Bholuwala
 Bir Chahal
 Bir Sikhanwala
 Burj Jwahar singh
 Burj Masta
 Buttar
 Chahal
 Chak Dhudi
 Chak Kalyan
 Chak Sahu
 Chak Seman
 Chak Shama
 Chambeli
 Chand baja
 Chaina
 Chet Singhwala
 Chugewala
 Dabrikhana
 Daggo Romana
 Dalewala
 Dana Romana
 Dawareana
 Deep Singhwala
 Deviwala
 Dhab Sher Singhwala
 Dhaipai
 Dhilwan Kalan
 Dhilwan Khurd
 Dhimanwali
 Dhudi
 Dhurkot
 Dod
 Faridkot (Rural)
 Ghaniewala
 Ghoniwala
 Ghuduwala
 Ghugiana
 Ghumiara
 GONDARA
 Golewala
 Gurusar
 Hadialana
 Hari Nau
 Hariewala
 Hassan Bhatti
 Jalaleana
 Jandwala
 Janerian
 Jeonwala
 Jhakhar Wala
 Jhariwala
 Jhok Sarkari
 Jhotiwala
 Kabalwala
 Kamiana
 Kanianwali
 Kaler
 Kauni
 Khara
 Khemuana
 Khilchi
 Kingra
 Koharwala
 Kotha Guru
 Kothe Kehar Singh
 Kot Sukhia
 lambwali
 Malla
 Matta
 Machaki Kalan
 Machaki Khurd
 Machaki Mal Singh
 Madahar
 Mallewala
 Mandwala
 Mani Singhwala
 Maur
 Mehmuana
 Midu Maan
 Mishriwala
 Moranwali
 Mumaru
 Nangal
 Naraingarh
 Nathalwala
 Nathewala
 Pakhi Kalan
 Pakhi Khurd
 Pakka
 Panjgrain Kalan
 Pehluwala
 Phide Kalan
 Phide Khurd
 Pindi Balochan
 Pipli
 Qila Nau
 Rajowala
 Rattirori
 Rupianwala
 Sadhanwala
 Sadhuwala
 Sadiq
 Saideke
 Sandhwan
 Sangatpura
 Sango Romana
 Sangrahoor
 Sher Singhwala
 Sibbian
 Sikhanwala
 Simrewala
 Sirsari
 Sukhanwala
  Sarawan 
 Tehna
 Thara
 Virewala kalan
 Virewala Khurd
 Wander Jatana
 Wara Daraka
 Rorikapura

Demographics
According to the 2011 census Faridkot district has a population of 617,508, roughly equal to the nation of Solomon Islands or the US state of Vermont. This gives it a ranking of 519th in India (out of a total of 640). 
Its population growth rate over the decade 2001-2011 was 12.18%.	Faridkot	has a sex ratio of 	889	females for every 1000 males, and a literacy rate of 70.6%. Scheduled Castes made up 38.92% of the population.

At the time of the 2011 census, 91.79% of the population spoke Punjabi and 6.91% Hindi as their first language.

References

External links 

 Official website
Faridkot district

 
Districts of Punjab, India
1972 establishments in Punjab, India